Durgapur Upazila may refer to:
Durgapur Upazila, Netrokona, Bangladesh
Durgapur Upazila, Rajshahi, Bangladesh